13 Hedgehogs (MxBx Singles 1994–1999) is the first compilation album by Melt-Banana. It features their first 13 singles, EPs and split records on one CD.

Since Melt-Banana's very first release was a 7-inch EP called Hedgehog they refer to all their minor releases (singles, EPs and splits) as hedgehogs. This contains the first 13, and so far they have released 23 "hedgehogs".

Track listing

Track information
 Tracks 1–6 from Hedgehog 7-inch EP (Charnel Music, 1994)
 Tracks 7–9 from split 7-inch EP w/ God Is My Co-Pilot (HG Fact, 1994)
 Tracks 10–12 from It's In the Pillcase 7-inch EP (Skin Graft Records, 1995)
 Tracks 13–18 from split 7-inch EP w/ Discordance Axis (HG Fact, 1995)
 Tracks 19–20 from split 7-inch EP w/ Pencilneck (Anti-Music, 1995)
 Tracks 21–24 from split 7-inch EP w/ Target Shoppers (Destroy All Music and Betley Welcome Careful Driver, 1996)
 Tracks 25–38 from split 10-inch EP w/ Stilluppsteypa (Fire inc./Something Weird, 1996)
 Tracks 39–40 from untitled (Piano One) 7-inch EP (Gentle Giant, 1996)
 Tracks 41–42 from split 7-inch EP w/ Plainfield (Smelly Records, 1997)
 Tracks 43–50 from Eleventh 7-inch EP (Slap a Ham Records, 1997)
 Track 51 from split 5" EP w/ Xerobot (Coat-Tail, 1998)
 Track 52 from split 7-inch EP w/ Killout Trash (Kool Pop Recordings/Rodel Records, 1998)
 Tracks 53–56 from Dead Spex 7-inch EP (HG Fact, 1998)

References

Melt-Banana compilation albums
2005 compilation albums